Düren is an electoral constituency (German: Wahlkreis) represented in the Bundestag. It elects one member via first-past-the-post voting. Under the current constituency numbering system, it is designated as constituency 90. It is located in western North Rhine-Westphalia, comprising the Düren district.

Düren was created for the inaugural 1949 federal election. Since 2005, it has been represented by Thomas Rachel of the Christian Democratic Union (CDU).

Geography
Düren is located in western North Rhine-Westphalia. As of the 2021 federal election, it is coterminous with the Düren district.

History
Düren was created in 1949, then known as Düren – Monschau – Schleiden. It acquired its current name in the 1965 election. In the 1949 election, it was North Rhine-Westphalia constituency 4 in the numbering system. In the 1953 through 1961 elections, it was number 63. From 1965 through 1998, it was number 56. From 2002 through 2009, it was number 91. Since the 2013 election, it has been number 90.

Originally, the constituency comprised the districts of Düren, Monschau, and Schleiden. In the 1972 election, it was coterminous with Düren district. In the 1976 election, it also contained the municipalities of Bedburg and Elsdorf from the Erftkreis district. It acquired its current borders in the 1980 election.

Members
The constituency has been held by the Christian Democratic Union (CDU) during all but two Bundestag terms since its creation. It was first represented by Bernhard Günther from 1949 to 1965, followed by Bert Even and Herbert Hermesdorf, each for a single term. Wolfgang Vogt was elected in 1972 and served until 1994. Thomas Rachel was elected in the 1994 election but defeated in 1998, when Dietmar Nietan of the Social Democratic Party (SPD) won the constituency. In 2005, Rachel regained it for the CDU. He was re-elected in 2009, 2013, 2017, and 2021.

Election results

2021 election

2017 election

2013 election

2009 election

References

Federal electoral districts in North Rhine-Westphalia
Düren (district)
1949 establishments in West Germany
Constituencies established in 1949